This is a list of episodes of the children's animated series The Cat in the Hat Knows a Lot About That!.

Series overview

Episodes

Season 1 (2010–12)

Season 2 (2012–15)

Season 3 (2018)

Specials (2012–16)

References

 

Lists of British animated television series episodes
Lists of Canadian children's animated television series episodes
Lists of American children's animated television series episodes
The Cat in the Hat